Wilton Lackaye (September 30, 1862 – August 22, 1932) was an American stage and film actor, who originated the role of Svengali (from the 1895 novel Trilby) in both stage and film.

Early life 
William Andrew Lackey was born in Loudoun County, Virginia the son of James Lackey and his wife Margaret Bagnam. He attended Georgetown University and Ottawa College, initially planning to be a priest. As an amateur, he acted with the Lawrence Barrett Club of Washington.

Career
Lackaye's professional acting debut occurred in 1883 when he portrayed Lucentio in Francesca da Rimini at the Star Theatre in New York. That summer he performed with a stock company in Dayton, after which he worked with the Carrie Swain Company.

He created the role of Svengali in the play Trilby in 1895 which he played on screen in 1915 opposite Clara Kimball Young. His film debut came in The Pit (1914).

Lackaye toured in vaudeville during World War I, performing in the one-act plays Quits and The Bomb.

Personal life
He married three times: first to actress Annie Lewis, second to Alice Evans and lastly to Katherine Alberta Riley. He had a son Wilton Lackaye Jr. with Alice Evans. 

He had two siblings in show business: James Lackaye Jr. and Helen Lackaye.

Death
Lackaye died of an acute heart attack at age 69 at his home in New York City. His funeral was held in St. Malachy's Roman Catholic Church, and he was buried in Calvary Cemetery.

Filmography
The Pit (1914)
Children of the Ghetto (1915)
Trilby (1915)
The Man of Shame (1915)
God's Crucible (1921)
What's Wrong with the Women? (1922)
The Lone Wolf (1924)
For Woman's Favor (1924)
The Sky Raider (1925)

References

External links

 
Wilton Lackaye portraits New York City Public Library, Billy Rose collection
 Gallery of Players vol.1-9; Wilton Lackaye

1862 births
1932 deaths
19th-century American male actors
American male stage actors
American male film actors
American male silent film actors
Male actors from Virginia
20th-century American male actors
The Lambs presidents
Members of The Lambs Club
People from Loudoun County, Virginia